Sclerochloa is a genus of Eurasian and North African plants in the grass family. Hardgrass is a common name for plants in this genus.

Species

Sclerochloa dura (L.) P.Beauv. - Europe, Asia, and North Africa from Spain + Morocco to Pakistan + Xinjiang; naturalized in Australia + North America
Sclerochloa woronowii (Hack.) Tzvelev - Tajikistan, Afghanistan, Iraq, Syria, Caucasus, Turkey

Formerly included

numerous species now considered better suited to other genera: Catapodium Cutandia Desmazeria Festuca Poa Puccinellia Sphenopus

References

External links
 Grassbase - The World Online Grass Flora

Pooideae
Poaceae genera
Taxa named by Palisot de Beauvois